Superior is a town in, and the county seat of, Mineral County, Montana, United States. The population was 830 at the 2020 census.

History
Superior was named after its founders' hometown of Superior, Wisconsin in 1869. The post office was established in 1871 after Mineral County became the site of one of the largest gold strikes that helped settle the West.

In the 1860s and 70s, several thousand miners converged on Cedar Creek. Mining has remained central to the economy, along with the development of logging and United States Forest Service activities.

In 1908, the Superior Hotel received the first Bibles to be placed in hotel rooms by The Gideons. This is noted on a historic plaque on Mullan Road.

The Mineral County Museum is located in Superior.

Geography

Superior is located within the Bitterroot Range of mountains. The Clark Fork flows through downtown, heading north towards St. Regis and ultimately emptying into Lake Pend Oreille near Cabinet, Idaho. The mountains to the west of Superior along the Montana/Idaho border receive a large amount of precipitation annually, mostly due to the amount of snow in the winter months. The snow pack melts throughout the spring and summer months, feeding the many mountain streams and creeks with water. All the water eventually reaches the Clark Fork in the valley below, where Superior is located.

Climate

Demographics

2010 census
As of the census of 2010, there were 812 people, 386 households, and 220 families residing in the town. The racial makeup of the town was 93.8% White, 0.7% African American, 1.2% Native American, 1.6% Asian, 0.1% from other races, and 2.5% from two or more races. Hispanic or Latino of any race were 2.3% of the population.

There were 386 households, of which 20.2% had children under the age of 18 living with them, 43.0% were married couples living together, 9.6% had a female householder with no husband present, 4.4% had a male householder with no wife present, and 43.0% were non-families. 37.6% of all households were made up of individuals, and 17.8% had someone living alone who was 65 years of age or older. The average household size was 2.05 and the average family size was 2.64.

The median age in the town was 52.1 years. 15.9% of residents were under the age of 18; 6.9% were between the ages of 18 and 24; 15.9% were from 25 to 44; 35.4% were from 45 to 64; and 25.9% were 65 years of age or older. The gender makeup of the town was 48.5% male and 51.5% female.

2000 census
As of the census of 2000, there were 893 people, 358 households, and 218 families residing in the town. The population density was 823.3 people per square mile (319.2/km2). There were 410 housing units at an average density of 378.0 per square mile (146.6/km2). The racial makeup of the town was 92.83% White, 0.11% African American, 2.91% Native American, 0.78% Asian, 0.11% from other races, and 3.25% from two or more races. Hispanic or Latino of any race were 1.90% of the population.

There were 358 households, out of which 29.1% had children under the age of 18 living with them, 47.8% were married couples living together, 9.2% had a female householder with no husband present, and 39.1% were non-families. 33.8% of all households were made up of individuals, and 12.8% had someone living alone who was 65 years of age or older. The average household size was 2.32 and the average family size was 2.93.

In the town, the population was spread out, with 25.3% under the age of 18, 6.9% from 18 to 24, 26.2% from 25 to 44, 24.0% from 45 to 64, and 17.6% who were 65 years of age or older. The median age was 40 years. For every 100 females there were 99.8 males. For every 100 females age 18 and over, there were 99.1 males.

The median income for a household in the town was $25,333, and the median income for a family was $31,650. Males had a median income of $24,688 versus $18,750 for females. The per capita income for the town was $14,154. About 10.4% of families and 17.0% of the population were below the poverty line, including 23.0% of those under age 18 and 7.4% of those age 65 or over.

Education
Superior High School is the main public high school in Superior.

The Mineral County Public Library is located in Superior. It has branches in Alberton and St. Regis.

Infrastructure
Interstate 90 passes Superior with access via exit 47.

Mineral County Airport is a county-owned public-use airport located two miles (3.7 km) southeast of town.

Notable people
 Pokey Allen, professional and college football player and coach, born in Superior.

References

External links

 Town of Superior
 Mineral County Chamber

Towns in Mineral County, Montana
County seats in Montana
Populated places established in 1869
1869 establishments in Montana Territory